Kosovo participated for the first time in the 2018 Mediterranean Games in Tarragona, Spain over 10 days from 22 June to 1 July 2018.

Medal summary

Medal table

Archery 

Men

Women

Athletics 

Men
Track & road events

Women
Track & road events

Beach volleyball

Boxing

Judo 

Men

Women

Karate 

Men

Women

Shooting 

Men

Swimming 

Men

Women

Table tennis 

Men

Taekwondo 

Men

Tennis 

Men

Women

Weightlifting 

Women

References

Nations at the 2018 Mediterranean Games
2018
Mediterranean Games